Kathryn Felicia Day (born June 28, 1979) is an American actress, writer, and web series creator. She is the creator and star of the web series The Guild (2007–2013), a show loosely based on her life as a gamer. She also wrote and starred in the Dragon Age web series Dragon Age: Redemption (2011). She is a founder of the online media company Geek & Sundry, best known for hosting the show Critical Role between 2015 and 2019. Day was a member of the board of directors of the International Academy of Web Television beginning December 2009 until the end of July 2012.

On television, Day has played Vi in the series Buffy the Vampire Slayer (2003) and Dr. Holly Marten in Eureka (2011), and had a recurring role as Charlie Bradbury on Supernatural (2012–2015, 2018–2020). She has also acted in movies such as Bring It On Again (2004), as well as the Internet musical Dr. Horrible's Sing-Along Blog (2008). In April 2017, she began appearing as Kinga Forrester in Mystery Science Theater 3000.

Early life
Day was born in Huntsville, Alabama. She began her acting career at the age of 7 when she starred as Scout in a local production of To Kill a Mockingbird. She studied operatic singing and ballet professionally, performing at concerts and competitions nationwide. Home-schooled throughout much of her childhood, she began college at the age of 16.

She was a National Merit Scholar (1995) and graduated as valedictorian of her class. An accomplished violinist, Day was accepted to the Juilliard School of Music but chose to attend the University of Texas at Austin on a full scholarship in violin performance. She double majored in mathematics and music performance, and graduated at the age of 19 in the top 4% of her class. She is also an avid player of a wide variety of video game genres. Much of her work on The Guild web series was based on her personal experience with video games, especially when she played World of Warcraft.

Career

Early career
After graduation, Day moved to Los Angeles to pursue a career in acting. She landed several roles in various short and independent films as well as commercials and guest spots on television shows, including Undeclared and Maybe It's Me. These parts propelled her to larger roles: a part in the film Bring It On Again, the starring role in June, and a recurring guest spot as potential Slayer Vi on television's Buffy the Vampire Slayer, a recurring role that is still occasionally used in that show's eighth season comic book series. In HBO's 2005 biopic of Franklin D. Roosevelt, Warm Springs, Day's singing was featured when her wheelchair-using character serenaded a dinner group with "I Won't Dance".

The Guild
Day is the creator, writer, and star of The Guild, a web series which aired from 2007 to 2013 and explored the MMORPG gaming subculture. The first season was primarily hosted on YouTube, where it garnered millions of views. Its second season premiered on Microsoft's three major video channels, Xbox Live, MSN Video and The Zune Marketplace, after Microsoft made a deal with The Guild, allowing Day, her cast and her crew to be paid for their work.

Day also created a song and music video called "(Do You Wanna Date My) Avatar", featuring the cast dressed up as their in-game personae. The final moments of the music video itself also detailed that the release date for the third season of Day's The Guild would be August 25, 2009. A second song and Bollywood style video "Game On" was released prior to the premiere of the fourth season of The Guild. A third and final music video, called "I'm the One That's Cool", features the members of the cast in the guise of an alternative band performing at a local venue, intercut with scenes of the cast as younger versions of their characters experiencing bullying at the hands of "cooler" and more popular kids while at school.

The Guild has won multiple awards, including the Greenlight Award for Best Original Digital Series Production at the South by Southwest festivals, several IAWTV Awards, including Best Comedy Series, the YouTube Video Award for Best Series, the Yahoo! Video Award for Best Series, and 2009 Streamy Awards for Best Comedy Web Series, Best Female Actor in a Comedy Web Series, and Best Ensemble Cast in a Web Series.

Geek & Sundry

In March 2012, Day announced that she would be launching a premium YouTube channel, "Geek & Sundry," on April 2.

Geek and Sundry took over production of The Guild for Season 6. Day hosts several shows on Geek & Sundry, most notably The Flog, Vaginal Fantasy, Felicia's Ark, and Co-Optitude (which co-stars Felicia's brother Ryon Day.)

In 2012 Day created the web series Tabletop with Wil Wheaton. She was an executive producer for the series and appeared regularly as a guest. In the same vein, in 2015 she suggested to the original cast of Critical Role to begin streaming their tabletop home game as a show.

In August 2014, Geek and Sundry was acquired by Legendary to produce content alongside of Chris Hardwick's Nerdist Industries, with Day retaining creative control.

Other work
In July 2008, Day starred as Penny in the three-part web-based musical Dr. Horrible's Sing-Along Blog (created by Joss Whedon, who also created Dollhouse and Buffy the Vampire Slayer, in which Day had parts). Day was featured as a patient in the episode "Not Cancer" of the medical drama House, and had a guest starring role in an unaired episode of sci-fi drama Dollhouse entitled "Epitaph One", as well as its series finale "Epitaph Two." Also in 2008, Day was featured in a series of commercials for Sears Blue Crew. She also appeared in the first of the revitalized Cheetos commercials. 
In the series Lie to Me, on the episode called "Tractor Man," airing December 14, 2009, Day sang a song called "White Lie" alongside Brendan Hines. Day starred with Kavan Smith in the Syfy film adaption of the Little Red Riding Hood saga, called Red, produced by Angela Mancuso. Day also played the continuing role of Dr. Holly Marten in the Syfy channel's original series, Eureka, appearing in 18 episodes during the last two seasons of the show. Day has also played the role of 'Gorgol' in the web series MyMusic directed by The Fine Brothers.

In February 2011, Day announced that she would be starring in a new web miniseries called Dragon Age: Redemption, based on the Dragon Age video game series developed by BioWare and aired on October 10, 2011. Day plays an elf named Tallis, and returns as the voice and likeness for the character in the Dragon Age II downloadable content Mark of the Assassin.

In January 2012, Day announced that she would be hosting a Google+ Hangout called Vaginal Fantasy. The Hangout featured Day along with Kiala Kazebee, Veronica Belmont, and Bonnie Burton. Every month they discussed lady-leaning paranormal and historical adventure books. In February 2012, Day guest starred in Sean "Day[9]" Plott's online webcast featuring Kingdoms of Amalur: Reckoning.

In April 2012, it was announced that Day would host the 2012 IndieCade Awards Ceremony on October 4, 2012. Also in April of that year, Day appeared on the YouTube show MyMusic as a Norwegian Black Metal singer named Gorgol. She guest starred in the second season of the Jane Espenson scripted web series, Husbands. In October 2012, she guest starred on The Game Station podcast and appeared in an episode of My Drunk Kitchen.

In 2013, Geek & Sundry and Atlas Games worked together to release a promotional pack for the card game Gloom for TableTop Day 2013 with a Felicia Day, Guild Goddess card. In 2014, Alderac Entertainment Group included a Felicia Day card in the storage case expansion, The Big Geeky Box for their card game Smash Up. In 2015, Plaid Hat Games released a Felicia Day character card for their board game Dead of Winter: A Cross Roads Game for Tabletop Day 2015.

On August 4, 2015, Day guest starred on Episode 9 of the Dear Hank & John podcast. On October 1, 2016, Day provided a guest voice for the Welcome to Night Vale podcast as Zookeeper Joanna Rey.

In April 2017, she began appearing as Kinga Forrester in Mystery Science Theater 3000. In August 2017, Day appeared as a guest in the My Little Pony: Friendship Is Magic episode "The Perfect Pear", voicing Pear "Buttercup" Butter, the presumed-deceased mother of one of the show's main characters, Applejack. In the episode, she also performs a romantic ballad, titled "You're In My Head Like a Catchy Song".

Day organised and hosted a Twitch charity livestream on June 30, 2018, in aid of Refugee and Immigrant Center for Education and Legal Services (RAICES), a Texas nonprofit. The 12-hour livestream raised over $212,000.

From 2018 to 2019, Day appeared in four episodes of the Syfy channel original series The Magicians as Poppy Kline.

Awards
In September 2008, TV Week included her in their list of Top 10 Web Video Creators.

During the inaugural Streamy Awards held in Los Angeles on March 28, 2009, Day received the award for the "Best Female Actor in a Comedy" for her work as protagonist Cyd Sherman in The Guild, and won the same award again in 2010.

She was also recognized for her work on Dr. Horrible's Sing-Along Blog in 2009. Day was also nominated for the Best Guest Appearance Award for the 3rd Streamy Awards.

In June 2018, she won a Behind the Voice Actors Award in Best Female Vocal Performance in a Television Series in a Guest Role for her role as Pear Butter in the episode "The Perfect Pear".

Personal life
In a blog post on October 22, 2014, Day expressed fears about taking a public stance on the Gamergate harassment campaign, and subsequently had her private information leaked.

On January 3, 2017, Day announced on social media that she was pregnant and expecting a baby girl in a few weeks. She announced her daughter's birth on January 30, 2017.

Filmography and other works

Film

Television/web

Video games

Books
Day is the author of the memoir You're Never Weird on the Internet (Almost), Embrace Your Weird: Face Your Fears and Unleash Creativity, as well as numerous works relating to The Guild web series.

References

External links

 Official website
 
  – 2019 video interview by Critical Role

1979 births
Living people
21st-century American actresses
Actors from Huntsville, Alabama
Actresses from Alabama
American film actresses
American television actresses
American voice actresses
American video game actresses
American web series actresses
American YouTubers
Nerd culture
Streamy Award winners
Twitch (service) streamers
University of Texas at Austin College of Natural Sciences alumni
Web series producers
Victims of cyberbullying
21st-century American singers
21st-century American women singers
University of Texas at Austin alumni